Coconut Grove, also known colloquially as The Grove, is the oldest continuously inhabited neighborhood of Miami in Miami-Dade County, Florida. The neighborhood is roughly bound by North Prospect Drive to the south, LeJeune Road to the west, South Dixie Highway (US 1) and Rickenbacker Causeway to the north, and Biscayne Bay to the east. It is south of the neighborhoods of Brickell and The Roads and east of Coral Gables. The neighborhood's name has been sometimes spelled "Cocoanut Grove" but the definitive spelling "Coconut Grove" was established when the city was incorporated in 1919.

What is today referred to as Coconut Grove was formed in 1925 when the city of Miami annexed two areas of about equal size, the city of Coconut Grove and most of the town of Silver Bluff. Coconut Grove approximately corresponds to the same area as the 33133 ZIP Code although the ZIP Code includes parts of Coral Way and Coral Gables and a small portion of ZIP Code 33129. The area is often referred to as "The Grove", and many locals take pride that Coconut Grove is one of the greenest areas of Miami.

Coconut Grove is directly served by the Miami Metrorail at Coconut Grove and Douglas Road stations.

History 

Several waves of immigration established Coconut Grove, the first in 1825, when the Cape Florida lighthouse went into operation, kept by John Dubose. Dr. Horace P. Porter is credited for coming up with the name when in 1873 he rented a home from Edmond D. Beasley's widow, who homesteaded 160 acres of bay front property. He lived there for only a year but during that time he established a post office which he named Coconut Grove. Around the same time the area saw an influx of Americans from the Northeastern US, as well as British and white Bahamian immigrants. Many black Bahamian immigrants were also hired to construct the historical landmarks in and around Coconut Grove. They were believed to be the only people capable of withstanding the extreme heat and humidity, as well as the large mosquito population. The first hotel on the South Florida mainland was located in Coconut Grove. Called the Bay View Inn (later known as the Peacock Inn), it was built in 1882, on the site of present-day Peacock Park, by English immigrants Isabella and Charles Peacock, who had been the owner of a wholesale meat business in London. Coconut Grove's first black settlement, in the 1880s, was established by Bahamian laborers who worked at the Peacock Inn. The Barnacle Historic State Park is the oldest house in Miami-Dade County still standing in its original location. It was built in 1891 and was home to Ralph Middleton Munroe, also known as "The Commodore" for being the first commodore and founder of the Biscayne Bay Yacht Club, an American yacht designer and early resident of Coconut Grove.

Formerly an independent city, Coconut Grove was annexed by the city of Miami in 1925. In the 1960s, bay-shore Coconut Grove served as the center of South Florida's youth countercultural movement, notably hosting several love-ins and concerts (including a now-infamous Doors concert at Dinner Key Auditorium) during the latter part of the decade. The Bahamian community continued to grow in Coconut Grove through the 1970s.

A surge of commercial development in Coconut Grove was driven by the construction of three major residential complexes during the late 1970s and early 1980s: Yacht Harbour Condominiums in 1975; Grove Isle, a condominium, club and hotel complex, in 1979; and L'Hermitage in 1980. This was followed with the opening of 2575 S. Bayshore Drive in 1982 and the 1983 opening of Grove Towers.  Further development was proposed for Grove Isle in 2013.

Economy 

Coconut Grove has a number of outdoor festivals and events, the most prominent of which is the annual Coconut Grove Arts Festival.  Others include the King Mango Strut, which began as a parody of the Orange Bowl Parade, and which continues each year on the last Sunday in December.  The Great Taste of the Grove Food & Wine Festival takes place each April.  Each June, the Goombay Festival transforms Grand Avenue in Coconut Grove into a Carnaval (Caribbean Carnival), celebrating Bahamian culture, with Bahamian food and Caribbean music (Junkanoo).

The Grove has numerous restaurants, open air and streetside cafes, and several waterfront restaurants and bars.  By night, the Grove becomes a center of nightlife frequented by locals, young professionals, students from the nearby University of Miami and Florida International University, and tourists.

Shopping is abundant in the Grove, with two open-air malls, CocoWalk, the Streets of Mayfair, and many other street shops and boutiques.

The Village Center, the three blocks radiating from and focusing on the intersection of Main, McFarland, and Grand Avenues, home to the majority of the retail and restaurant business in the Grove, is also home to three gyms, a multiplex movie house in CocoWalk, several parking garages, a state historic site, an elementary school, a City of Miami fire station, several large condos and residential rental towers, the Coconut Grove Post Office, and two sizable parks. Development and redevelopment continue to redefine and transform the area.

Major corporations including Arquitectonica, Spanish Broadcasting System, and Watsco are located in the Grove.

The eastern border of Coconut Grove is Biscayne Bay, which lends itself to the local boating and sailing communities. The area features the Coconut Grove Sailing Club, Biscayne Bay Yacht Club, a sizable municipal marina, Dinner Key Marina, and others  The US Sailing Center is on the Bay between Kennedy Park and the Coral Reef Yacht Club. Pan Am's seaplane operations were based at Dinner Key, and the Miami City Hall is based in the old Pan Am terminal building.

Demographics 
Demographically, Coconut Grove is split up into "Northeast Coconut Grove" and "Southwest Coconut Grove", and as of 2000, the total population of both of the neighborhood's sections made up between 18,953 and 19,646 people. The zip codes for all of Coconut Grove include 33129 and 33133. As of 2000, there were 9,695 males and 9,951 females. The median age for males were 38.4 years old, while the median age for females were 40.3 years old. The average household size had 2.1 people, while the average family size had 2.8 members. The percentage of married-couple families (among all households) was 33.6%, while the percentage of married-couple families with children (among all households) was 11.1%, and the percentage of single-mother households (among all households) was 7.6%. The percentage of never-married males 15 years old and over was 18.3%, while the percentage of never-married females 15 years old and over was 14.3%. The percentage of people that speak English not well or not at all made up 8.1% of the population. The percentage of residents born in Florida was 31.6%, the percentage of people born in another U.S. state was 34.7%, and the percentage of native residents but born outside the U.S. was 2.3%, while the percentage of foreign born residents was 31.4%.

As of 2000, Northeast Grove had a population of 9,812 residents, with 5,113 households, and 2,221 families residing in the neighborhood. The median household income was $63,617.82. The racial makeup of the neighborhood was 35.24% Hispanic or Latino of any race, 2.25% Black or African American, 60.96% White (non-Hispanic), and 1.55% other races (non-Hispanic).

As of 2000, Southwest Grove had a population of 9,141 residents, with 3,477 households, and 2,082 families residing in the neighborhood. The median household income was $63,617.82. The racial makeup of the neighborhood was 14.80% Hispanic or Latino of any race, 48.27% Black or African American, 35.27% White (non-Hispanic), and 1.66% other races (non-Hispanic).

The "West" Grove is predominantly composed of people who are of Afro-Bahamian descent. Bahamian sailors were one of the first groups of settlers in the area. The Goombay festival is a celebration of the rich history of this historically Bahamian neighborhood.

Transportation 
Coconut Grove is served by Metrobus throughout the area, and by the Miami Metrorail at:

  Vizcaya (SW 32nd Road and U.S. 1)
  Coconut Grove (SW 27th Avenue and U.S. 1)
  Douglas Road (SW 37th Avenue and U.S. 1)

Metrobus' Coconut Grove Connection connects at Coconut Grove and Douglas Road stations, going to many popular areas within the Grove, including CocoWalk and Peacock Park.

Education and institutions

Cultural institutions 

 Coconut Grove Playhouse
 Marjory Stoneman Douglas Home
 Miami Science Museum, moved to downtown Miami
 The Barnacle Historic State Park
 The Kampong
 Vizcaya Museum and Gardens

Libraries 
Miami-Dade Public Library operates area public libraries

Schools

Elementary schools 
Miami-Dade County Public Schools operates area public schools:

Coconut Grove Elementary School
Dade County Training School (1899–1937)
Frances S. Tucker Elementary School
George W. Carver Elementary School

Middle schools 
George Washington Carver School, while actually in Coral Gables, serves Coconut Grove. As a magnet school, it does not admit most of its students based on geographical area, but minimum quotas apply regarding to serving Coconut Grove.

High schools 
Bridgeprep Academy of Arts and Minds (2003-2018)
George Washington Carver School

Private schools 
Ransom Everglades School, founded in 1903
St. Hugh Catholic School, 1956
Immaculata-Lasalle High School, 1958
St. Stephen's Episcopal Day School, 1958
Carrollton School of the Sacred Heart, 1961
Coconut Grove Montessori School
Vanguard School

Points of interest 

 Charles Avenue
 CocoWalk
 Dinner Key
 First Coconut Grove School
 Mercy Hospital
 Miami City Hall
 Plymouth Congregational Church
 Trapp Homestead
 Woman's Club of Coconut Grove
 Grove Isle

Parks 

Source:

 The Kampong: an 8-acre (32,000 m2) tropical garden that forms part of the National Tropical Botanical Garden
 The Barnacle Historic State Park: Built in the late 19th century, the former home of Ralph Middleton Munroe is the oldest home in Miami-Dade County still standing in its original location and is situated on the shore of Biscayne Bay. The forest surrounding the home is tropical hardwood hammock and is the last of its kind in the area. The unique architecture includes period furniture and wide porches that afford magnificent views.
 Peacock Park / Kenneth Myers Bayside Park
 David Kennedy Park
 Merrie Christmas Park
 Steele Park
 Blanche Park
 Elizabeth Virrick Park
 Kirk Munroe Park
 Coconut Grove Park
 Grand Avenue Park
 Ingraham Terrace Park
 Sunrise Park
 Marjory Stoneman Douglas Mini Park
 Dinner Key Picnic Islands Park
 Alice C. Wainwright Park

In popular culture 

The movie All About The Benjamins was filmed in Coconut Grove (specifically, ShakeAleg water sports' parking lot & boatyard) in 2002, starring Ice Cube and Mike Epps.
The movie Where the Pavement Ends was filmed in Coconut Grove in 1923. It was directed by Rex Ingram and starred Ramón Novarro.
Pioneer folk rock musician Fred Neil resided in, and wrote songs about Coconut Grove, notably on the song "Bleecker & MacDougal".
"Coconut Grove" is a song written by John Sebastian and recorded by The Lovin' Spoonful in 1967. It later was covered by David Lee Roth and Paul Weller. Smiths guitarist Johnny Marr has expressed a fondness for the song.
In the film Scarface, Manny lives in an upscale home in the Grove.
In the TV series Dexter, based on the book series by Jeff Lindsay, Dexter Morgan lives in Coconut Grove.
In the video for the song "Careless Whisper" George Michael can be seen looking from a condominium balcony in Coconut Grove, FL
In the 1978 song "Voila, An American Dream" by Rodney Crowell and the 1979 cover version by the (Nitty Gritty) Dirt Band, Coconut Grove is mentioned prominently in the chorus as a vacation destination.
In the movie Bad Boys, Martin Lawrence and Will Smith follow a suspect through Coconut Grove.
In Dave Barry's novel Big Trouble, the main setting is Coconut Grove.
A set for the TV series Burn Notice was in Coconut Grove, in what was once the City of Miami's Convention Center.
Coconut Grove is the setting for the movie Meet The Fockers.
Coconut Grove has been a location on the show The First 48.
Coconut Grove is a location in the 1985 Burt Reynolds film Stick.
The 2008 film Marley & Me with Jennifer Aniston and Owen Wilson, based on John Grogan's book, was filmed on location in Coconut Grove.
CSI: Miami season 4 episode 10 ("Shattered") is set in Coconut Grove.
In the first episode of The Golden Girls, "The Engagement", at the end of the episode, Rose asks Dorothy and Blanche if they would like to go to Coconut Grove for lunch, to celebrate their friendship.
Coconut Grove is reference in "Tenement Song" by Pixies off of their 2016 album, "Head Carrier".
In the 2010 song "Marathon" by Tennis, Coconut Grove is mentioned as being the song's narrators sail from Marathon, Florida to Coconut Grove.

Notable people 
Former and current residents include:

Historic Coconut Grove 

Established in 1825, Coconut Grove is one of Miami's oldest neighborhoods. As such, many of Miami's oldest buildings and homes are located in the Grove. Some of these include:

References

External links 

 
Neighborhoods in Miami
Populated places on the Intracoastal Waterway in Florida
Shopping districts and streets in the United States
Former municipalities in Florida
Bahamian-American culture in Florida
Dexter
1825 establishments in Florida Territory
Populated places established in 1825